Burbank Western Channel (also known as Burbank Western Wash) is a  tributary of the Los Angeles River in the eastern San Fernando Valley of Los Angeles County, California.

The stream begins at the confluence of Hansen Heights Channel and La Tuna Canyon Lateral in Sun Valley. It runs adjacent to Interstate 5 for most of its length and is entirely encased in a concrete flood control channel. The stream travels southeast through downtown Burbank, the Riverside Rancho area of Glendale, ultimately joining the Los Angeles River by the edge of the Los Angeles Equestrian Center.

In 1991, the city of Burbank was sued by the EPA for allowing companies to exceed discharge limits into the channel. Leading pollutants in the stream include algae, ammonia, cadmium, odors, unnatural scum/foam, and trash.

Under the American Recovery and Reinvestment Act of 2009, the U.S. Army Corps of Engineers has planned to allocate $700,000 to repair the channel wall which is "currently in danger of failing."

In October 2009, Burbank reached an agreement with the state on the 12 mile San Fernando Bikeway, a new bicycle path along San Fernando Boulevard from Sylmar to Burbank. This would include a portion next to the channel that connects to the Downtown Burbank Metrolink Station.

Crossings and tributaries
From mouth to source (year built in parentheses):

Los Angeles Equestrian Center [Pedestrian/Equestrian Bridge]
Riverside Drive (1940)
Victory Boulevard (1940)
West Alameda Avenue (1949)
West Elmwood Avenue [Pedestrian Bridge]
South Lake Street/West Providencia Avenue (1949)
West Verdugo Avenue (1949)
Abandoned Railroad
West Olive Avenue (1949)
East Magnolia Boulevard (1949)
Abandoned Railroad
Abandoned Railroad
Submerged from South Front Street to Interstate 5
Submerged under North San Fernando Boulevard past Landis Street
North Buena Vista Street/Winona Avenue (1958)
Ramps from and to Interstate 5 (1960)
Cohasset Street (1958)
North Hollywood Way (1962)
Lanark Street (1962)
Glenoaks Boulevard (1962)
Nettleton Street (1961)

Hansen Heights Channel
Vinedale Street
Penrose Street
La Tuna Canyon Road
Tuxford Street
Private road
Sunland Boulevard
Pendleton Street
Clybourn Avenue
Submerged past Stonehurst Avenue

La Tuna Canyon Lateral
Vinedale Street
Jordan Lane
Private road
Village Avenue
Wildwood Avenue
Martindale Avenue
Morning Glow Way
Private roads x5
La Tuna Canyon Road

References

Rivers of Los Angeles County, California
Tributaries of the Los Angeles River
Geography of the San Fernando Valley
Washes of California
Burbank, California
Glendale, California
Sun Valley, Los Angeles
Rivers of Southern California